Clarence William Russell (? – February 5, 1919) was an American football, basketball, and baseball coach.  He served as the head football coach at West Virginia University in 1907, at the Colorado School of Mines in 1908, and at New Mexico College of Agriculture and Mechanic Arts—now known as New Mexico State University—from 1914 to 1916, compiling a career  college football record of 19–15–2.  Russell was also the head basketball coach at New Mexico A&M from 1914 to 1917 and the school's head baseball coach in 1915.  A native of Oskaloosa, Iowa, Russell died on February 5, 1919, in Visalia, California.

Head coaching record

Football

References

Year of birth missing
1919 deaths
American football guards
American football tackles
Basketball coaches from Iowa
Chicago Maroons football players
Chicago Maroons men's track and field athletes
Colorado Mines Orediggers football coaches
New Mexico State Aggies athletic directors
New Mexico State Aggies baseball coaches
New Mexico State Aggies football coaches
New Mexico State Aggies men's basketball coaches
West Virginia Mountaineers football coaches
People from Oskaloosa, Iowa